Timothy E. Easton (born April 25, 1966) is an American guitarist and singer-songwriter playing rock and roll, folk and Americana music. His latest release, You Don't Really Know Me was released on August 27, 2021.

Biography
Easton was raised in Akron, Ohio, forming the band Kosher Spears while at college. He traveled abroad for a time, busking in London, Paris, Spain, Italy, Yugoslavia, Czechoslovakia, and Ireland.

The Haynes Boys
On his return to the US in the mid-1990s, Easton joined the Haynes Boys with Freddie Free (guitar), Jovan Karcic (drums), and Aaron Rice (bass).

In 1996, they released their only album Haynes Boys (often referred to as Guardian Angel because of the cover illustration).

On June 23, 2015, Re-Vinyl Records reissued the album on vinyl with the originally intended cover art and updated liner notes.

The band kicked off a series of shows on June 25, 2015, in Columbus, Ohio, culminating with a June 28 show at the ComFest community festival in Columbus.

Solo career
When the members of the Haynes Boys split to pursue individual projects, Easton recorded his 1998 debut album Special 20 on Heathen Records, a label launched by Easton and his manager Blake Squires.

He subsequently relocated to California, and signed a deal with EMI Publishing and a record deal with New West Records. In 2001, he released The Truth About Us on which he was supported by Ken Coomer, John Sirratt, and Jay Bennett, all of Wilco.

Released in 2003, Break Your Mother's Heart featured Mike Campbell (guitar), Jim Keltner (drums), Jai Winding (piano), Greg Leisz (dobro), and Jilann O’Neill (backing vocals).

Ammunition was released in 2006. Lucinda Williams and Tift Merritt contributed harmony vocals, and Gary Louris (the Jayhawks) produced three tracks.

2009 saw the release of Porcupine which featured Sam Brown (drums), Matt Surgeson (bass), and Kenny Vaughan (guitar).

Since 1966 was a primarily solo acoustic album released in 2011 and featuring 11 previously unreleased songs.

Also released in 2011, Beat the Band included Aaron Lee Tasjan (guitar and piano), Mark Stepro (drums), and Alex Livingstone (bass).

In 2013, Easton released Not Cool which he began recording after he moved back to Nashville and was inspired by a show at Robert's Western World. He described the album as "kind of a 50s, Sun Studio thing, kind of a rock and roll thing." Not Cool was featured as album of the week on the January 3rd 2022 edition of Belgium's Dr Boogie radio show.

For American Fork, released in 2016, Easton went into the studio with multi-instrumentalist and producer Patrick Damphier, who has worked with Jessica Lea Mayfield and The Mynabirds. The record was almost entirely recorded live with Jon Radford (drums), Michael Rinne (bass), Robbie Crowell (keyboards and horns), Russ Pahl (pedal steel), and Larissa Maestro (cello). Maestro, Megan Palmer, Ariel Bui, and Emma Berkey provided vocal harmonies.

In 2021, Easton released his 10th LP You Don't Really Know Me via new label home Black Mesa Records. The album was produced by Brad Jones and Robin Eaton, who had previously work with Easton early in his career.

Easton Stagger Phillips
In 2007, Easton joined Leeroy Stagger and Evan Phillips, performing as Easton, Stagger, Phillips.  Easton and Stagger initially performed in 2008 as support acts for Phillips' band The Whipsaws.

The group released One for the Ditch, on Rebeltone Records, in 2008. Their second album Resolution Road was released in 2014.

Awards
Easton was nominated for the 9th Annual Independent Music Awards Vox Pop award for 'Best Americana Song' with "Burgundy Red".

His album Porcupine won the 9th Annual Independent Music Awards Vox Pop vote for best Album Packaging.

Other projects
Cold and Bitter Tears: The Songs of Ted Hawkins, released in late 2015 on Austin-based Eight 30 Records, features Easton's recording of Hawkins' song "One Hundred Miles."

Personal life
Easton has one daughter, and lives in Nashville, Tennessee.

Discography

Solo studio
 1998: Special 20 (Heathen Records)
 2001: The Truth About Us (New West)
 2003: Break Your Mother's Heart (New West)
 2006: Ammunition (New West)
 2009: Porcupine (New West)
 2011: Since 1966, Volume 1 (Campfire Propaganda)
 2013: Not Cool (Campfire Propaganda)
 2016: American Fork (Last Chance)
 2018: Paco & the Melodic Polaroids (Campfire Propaganda)
 2019: Exposition (Campfire Propaganda)
 2021: You Don't Really Know Me (Black Mesa Records)

Solo live
 2008: Live at Water Canyon (Sonic Rendezvous)

Compilations
 2013: Before the Revolution: The Best of Tim Easton 1998–2011 (New West)

With the Freelan Barons
 2011: Beat the Band (Campfire Propaganda)

With the Haynes Boys
 1996: Guardian Angel (Slab Recordings)

With Easton Stagger Phillips
 2008: One for the Ditch (Blue Rose)
 2014: Resolution Road (Blue Rose)

As guest musician
 2008: Lucinda Williams – Little Honey (Lost Highway)
 2008: Otis Gibbs – Grandpa Walked a Picketline (Wanamaker / Thirty Tigers)
 2008: The Whipsaws – 60 Watt Avenue (Blue Rose / Shut Eye)
 2009: Leeroy Stagger – Everything is Real (Blue Rose / Rebel Tone)
 2014: Cory Branan – The No-Hit Wonder (Bloodshot)
 2015: Amy Speace – That Kind Of Girl (Continental Song City)
 2015: Salto – Salto (self-released)
 2016: Levi Parham – These American Blues (Music Road)

As music contributor
 2009: Various Artists – A Bob Dylan Tribute: So Happy Just To See You Smile (Hanky Panky) – track 9, "Spanish Harlem Incident"
 2015: Various Artists: Cold And Bitter Tears: The Songs Of Ted Hawkins (Eight 30) – track 3, "One Hundred Miles"

References

External links
Tim Easton's website
Easton Stagger Phillips website
Tim's Facebook Fan Page
Tim on iTunes
Tim Easton at MySpace
Easton/Stagger/Phillips at MySpace
 
 
 
 

American rock guitarists
American male guitarists
American rock songwriters
American alternative country singers
American country rock singers
American country singer-songwriters
American rock singers
Independent Music Awards winners
Living people
Singer-songwriters from Ohio
Musicians from Akron, Ohio
New West Records artists
Ohio State University alumni
People from Lewiston, New York
1966 births
Guitarists from Ohio
20th-century American guitarists
Country musicians from New York (state)
Country musicians from Ohio
20th-century American male musicians
American male singer-songwriters
Singer-songwriters from New York (state)